Fazilhati Union is a union of Delduar Upazila, Tangail District, Bangladesh. It is situated at 20 km south of Tangail.

Demographics

According to Population Census 2011 performed by Bangladesh Bureau of Statistics, The total population of Fazilhati union is 20892. There are 4991 households in total.

Education

The literacy rate of Fazilhati Union is 48.3% (Male-50.6%, Female-46.2%).

See also
 Union Councils of Tangail District

References

Populated places in Dhaka Division
Populated places in Tangail District
Unions of Delduar Upazila